Raj Kundra is a British-Indian businessman, who was ranked as the 198th richest British Asian by Success.

His father, Bal Krishan Kundra was a middle-class businessman and his mother Usha Rani Kundra was a shop assistant when he was a child. 

Kundra has had various investment interests, including cricket and mixed martial arts. He has been married to Shilpa Shetty, an Indian actress, since 2009.

Early life 
Raj Kundra's parents were Punjabi Hindus who migrated from raipur, India. His father, Bal Krishan Kundra became a bus conductor in London before running a small business. His mother, Ushaw Rani Kundra worked as a shop assistant.

Kundra was born and raised in London. At the age of 18, Kundra relocated to Dubai and later Nepal and started a business selling pashmina shawls to fashion retailers in Britain and made his first millions. In 2007, he moved to Dubai and set up Essential General Trading LLC, a company dealing in precious metals, construction, mining and renewable energy projects. He was also at that time involved in the financing and production of Bollywood films.

Kundra has been married twice, first to Kavita Kundra, with whom he had a daughter. The couple later divorced. On 22 November 2009 Kundra married Bollywood actress Shilpa Shetty. Kundra and Shetty have a son, born on 21 May 2012, and a daughter, born through surrogacy on 15 February 2020.

Kundra is involved with his wife's charitable organisation, the Shilpa Shetty Foundation. His book titled, How Not to Make Money was published in 2013.

Business included Satyug Gold, Super Fight League, and more recently Bastian Hospitality a restaurant chain in Mumbai.

In 2015, Kundra was among the promoters of online and television broadcast platform Best Deal TV, an Indian television home shopping channel capitalising on celebrity endorsements. His co-promoter was Bollywood actor Akshay Kumar.

Under the government of India's Startup India initiative, Kundra is set to launch India's first live streaming social media app, Jaldi Live Stream App which will allow professional as well as amateur streamers to live stream their content.

Indian Premier League 

In 2009, Kundra and Shetty invested in the Indian Premier League cricket team Rajasthan Royals using an offshore company based in Mauritius. The legality of the investment was questioned by departments of the Government of India.

In June 2013, Kundra was questioned by Delhi Police with regard to the 2013 Indian Premier League spot-fixing case, which had involved the arrest of some Rajasthan Royals players, further Delhi police have given a clean chit to Kundra in reply on right to information (RTI). In July 2015 a panel appointed by the Supreme Court of India imposed a life ban from the cricket-related activity on him. Further, Kundra denied the involvement and appeal to the Supreme Court of India.

Umesh Goenka, a business partner of Raj Kundra claimed in a court that he was forced to implicate Kundra in betting by Delhi Police and to save himself from physical torture and from being charged under Maharashtra Control of Organised Crime Act.

Super Fight League 
Kundra and Bollywood star Sanjay Dutt launched India's first professional mixed martial arts fighting league, the Super Fight League, on 16 January 2012.

Awards and honours 
Kundra was awarded the Champions of Change Award in 2019, for his involvement with Swachh Bharat Mission. The award was conferred by former President of India Pranab Mukherjee at Vigyan Bhavan New Delhi on 20 January 2020.

References 

Living people
Businesspeople from London
British Hindus
British people of Punjabi descent
British businesspeople of Indian descent
British expatriates in India
Indian Premier League franchise owners
Year of birth missing (living people)